Kioumars Hashemi is an Iranian executive chairman who served as President of the National Olympic Committee of Iran, from 2014 to 2018.

References

External links
BBC on Kioumars Hashemi

Living people
Iranian sports executives and administrators
Sharif University of Technology alumni
Year of birth missing (living people)